The North Eastern State Trail is a  bicycle and hiking trail in Michigan that creates a non-highway right-of-way between Alpena and Cheboygan within three northern counties of Michigan's Lower Peninsula. The trail uses a section of the former roadbed of the Detroit and Mackinac Railway.      

Points of interest along the trail, from south to north, include:

 Alpena
 Posen
 Onaway
 Aloha State Park 
 Mullett Lake
 Cheboygan

References

Protected areas of Alpena County, Michigan
Protected areas of Cheboygan County, Michigan
Protected areas of Presque Isle County, Michigan